Michael Granville Valpy (born 1942) is a Canadian journalist and author. He wrote for The Globe and Mail newspaper where he covered both political and human interest stories until leaving the newspaper in October, 2010. Through a long career at the Globe, he was a reporter, Toronto- and Ottawa-based national political columnist, member of the editorial board, deputy managing editor, and Africa-based correspondent during the last years of apartheid. He has also been a national political columnist for the Vancouver Sun. Since leaving the Globe he has been published by the newspaper on a freelance basis as well as by CBC News Online, the Toronto Star and the National Post.

Life
Valpy was born in 1942 in Toronto and lived there until his family moved to Vancouver, where his mother's family was from, after World War II. His great-grandfather, W. W. Walkem, was Vancouver's first European doctor and the brother of George Anthony Walkem, British Columbia's third premier. He has three children. He has been married and divorced twice, first with The Globe and Mail'''s former chief librarian, Amanda Ferguson, and second with lawyer Deborah Coyne.

Career
Valpy studied at the University of British Columbia towards a general arts degree for two years before dropping out of university after the premature death of his father and having no money to continue his studies. After considering entering the Anglican priesthood, Valpy went to work for the Vancouver Sun in 1961 as a reporter and was then night city editor at the short-lived Vancouver Times. In 1965, when the Times folded, he was hired by The Globe and Mail first as a reporter, then as a feature writer and member of the editorial board. In 1966 and 1967, Valpy was a staff member for the short-lived Company of Young Canadians. He returned to the Vancouver Sun, first as a member of its editorial board and then as a political columnist based in Ottawa, Ontario. In 1981, he rejoined The Globe and Mail as a national affairs columnist and subsequently served as its Africa correspondent from 1984 to 1988 after which he returned to Canada to serve as the newspaper's urban affairs columnist, its deputy managing editor and, after running for Parliament for the NDP, as the paper's religion writer and feature writer.

Valpy left The Globe and Mail in 2010. He is a senior fellow at Massey College at the University of Toronto, a fellow at the University of Toronto School of Public Policy and Governance and teaches in the university's book and media studies program. He was the 2011-2012 Canwest Global Fellow in Media at University of Western Ontario and was awarded the 2012-2013 Atkinson Fellowship in Public Policy. He continues to write as a freelance journalist with pieces published on the CBC News website and the Toronto Star as well as The Globe and Mail.

Political views
Despite being from what he describes as a "strongly Tory monarchist British imperialist-quite right wing" family, Valpy was one of the more left-leaning writers at the Globe. In the 2000 federal election, Valpy ran as a New Democratic Party candidate in the Toronto riding of Trinity—Spadina, against Liberal Party of Canada incumbent Tony Ianno. He was not elected.

Works
Valpy co-authored three books (two on Canada's Constitution and the third on the 21st-century generation of new Canadian adults), produced public affairs documentaries for CBC Radio, contributed chapters to several books on public policy issues and written for Maclean's, Time Canada, Policy Options, Shambhala Sun and Elm Street'' magazines.

Awards
He has won three National Newspaper Awards (two for foreign reporting and one for an analysis of dysfunctional students in the public education system) and been nominated for a fourth (for a profile of Michael Ignatieff), In 1997, he was awarded an honorary doctorate (D.Litt.) from Trent University. He also received the Queen's Jubilee Medal in 2002.

References

1942 births
Canadian columnists
Journalists from Toronto
New Democratic Party candidates for the Canadian House of Commons
Canadian monarchists
Living people
Massey College, Toronto
University of British Columbia alumni
The Globe and Mail columnists
Canadian political journalists
Canadian social commentators